The coffin of Nedjemankh is a gilded ancient Egyptian coffin from the late Ptolemaic Period. It once encased the mummy of Nedjemankh, a priest of the ram-god Heryshaf.

Description 

The coffin is 181 cm (72.25 in) long, 53 cm (20.875 in) wide, and 28 cm (11 in) deep. It is made of a combination of cartonnage (linen, glue, and gesso), paint, gold, silver, resin, glass, wood, and leaded bronze. The lid is covered with vignettes illustrating funerary spells, and has an inscription invoking gold and silver; inside is a figure of Nut, the goddess of the sky, partially covered with silver foil. On the base of the coffin is a djed pillar.

Provenance 
The coffin is believed to have been looted from Egypt in 2011. Before its true history was known, it was purchased by New York City's Metropolitan Museum of Art in July 2017 for 3.5 million euros, or about 3.95 million dollars. 

The museum purchased the coffin from Christophe Kunicki, a Paris-based art dealer who advertised as specialising in "Mediterranean Antiquities", particularly "Greek, Roman, Egyptian and Near East antiquities". According to the ownership history received by the Met at the time, the coffin had been exported from Egypt in 1971 with a licence granted by the "Antiquities Organization / Egyptian Museum, Cairo." It was said to have been among the stock of Habib Tawadrus, a dealer since at least 1936, who operated Habib & Company across from Cairo's Shepheard's Hotel; a representative for Tawadrus's heirs exported the coffin to Switzerland, with a translation of the export license provided in February 1977 by the German embassy in Cairo, for use of the representative and new European owner. Egypt allowed the export of some antiquities prior to the passage of the Antiquities Protection Law of 1983. The museum believed the coffin to have remained in the collection of that family until its 2017 purchase.

Return to Egypt
In February 2019, the Metropolitan Museum was approached by the New York County District Attorney's Office, which presented the museum with evidence  provided by the Egyptian government that the dealer’s 1971 export license had been forged. Further evidence showed the coffin had been stolen in 2011 and its ownership history was a fraud. The museum then shuttered the then-ongoing exhibition Nedjemankh and His Gilded Coffin, previously scheduled to run through April 21, 2019, and handed the coffin over to the Antiquities Repatriation Department of the Egyptian Ministry of Antiquities.

See also 
 Art of ancient Egypt

References

Bibliography 
  
  
  

Art of ancient Egypt
Sarcophagi
Archaeological theft
2nd-century BC works
1st-century BC works
Ancient Egyptian priests
Egypt–United States relations